Anthology of Fantastic Zoology is an orchestral symphony by the American composer Mason Bates.  The work was commissioned by the Chicago Symphony Orchestra, for whom Bates was then composer-in-residence.  It was premiered June 18, 2015 at Symphony Center in Chicago, with the Chicago Symphony Orchestra performing under conductor Riccardo Muti, to whom the work is dedicated.  The piece is based on the eponymous book by Jorge Luis Borges.

Composition

Inspiration
The movements of the work are titled after mythical creatures from the book Anthology of Fantastic Zoology by Jorge Luis Borges.  Bates commented on this inspiration in the score program notes, writing:

Structure
The piece has a duration of roughly 30 minutes and is composed in eleven continuous movements:
Forest: Twilight
Sprite
Dusk
The A Bao A Qu
Nymphs
Night
The Gryphon
Midnight
Sirens
The Zaratan
Madrugada

Instrumentation
Anthology of Fantastic Zoology is scored for an orchestra comprising three flutes (3rd doubling piccolo), three oboes (3rd doubling English horn), three clarinets (2nd doubling E-flat clarinet and bass clarinet), two bassoons, contrabassoon, four French horns, three trumpets, two trombones, bass trombone, tuba, three percussionists, timpani, harp, piano/celesta, and strings.

Reception
Reviewing the world premiere, Lawrence A. Johnson of the Chicago Classical Review praised the symphony, remarking, "Bates has crafted a kaleidoscopic half-hour work, choosing an array of Borges’ mythical creatures to paint in eleven interstiched sections."  Johnson continued, "Dedicated to Muti, Zoology is the 37-year-old composer's largest and most ambitious orchestral work to date, scored for huge forces and massive percussion battery.  John von Rhein of the Chicago Tribune also lauded the piece, writing:
Georgia Rowe of the San Jose Mercury News called the piece "scintillating" and said, "It's a large, panoramic 30-minute score, one that surges with vitality and glistens with alluring orchestral color."

References

 4
2015 compositions
21st-century classical music
Music commissioned by the Chicago Symphony Orchestra